Sikuri is a musical style from Peru the kind of huayño, consisting of siku players and drum accompaniment. There are usually around twenty siku players. As each siku cannot play all the notes of a scale, the siku players use an interlocking technique to play the entire melody. The drums produce a fast, pounding beat in the rhythm of huayño.

Sikuri is often performed at festivals by the Aymara-speaking peoples near Lake Titicaca.

References

External links
 Peruvian Dances - Sikuri

Huayno